The following is a list of Oricon number-one singles of 2023.

Chart history

See also
List of Oricon number-one albums of 2023

References

2023 in Japanese music
Japan Oricon singles
Lists of number-one songs in Japan